Actin related protein 10 homolog is a protein that in humans is encoded by the ACTR10 gene.

References

Further reading